Vysokaya is a mountain in the eastern part of the Middle Urals in Sverdlovsk Oblast in Russia. The height of the mountain is 380 m. It is formed with porphyries and syenites. There is a big lodestone deposit on Mount Vysokaya.

References

Mountains of Sverdlovsk Oblast